Airstrike II (shown on the box cover, but not the title screen, as Airstrike 2) is a horizontally scrolling shooter written by Steven A. Riding and published by English Software for the Atari 8-bit family in 1983. Airstrike II is a successor to the 1982 Airstrike which was also programmed by Riding. Both games have gameplay similar to the Scramble arcade game.

Gameplay

The goal of Airstrike II is to clear all five zones using a fighter ship armed with a laser gun and bombs. The ship's ammo and fuel are limited, but can be replenished by shooting a respective dump (F for fuel and A for ammo). The player's ship must navigate tight caverns and watch for enemy fighters and heat-sensitive missiles. The game is split in five zones, which have identical layout but increasing level of difficulty. Some improvements over the predecessor include addition of a scrolling map and a title screen music.

Reception
Airstrike II was met with a mixed response. Big K magazine reviewed it twice, with the first reviewer concluding: "It may be very clever, but it's a terrible looking game, and I, for one, spend too much time in front of a VDU to want to have to look at something this ugly." while a second reviewer was more forgiving: "Excellent use has been made of the Atari 800's considerable graphics [...] As it stands, probably English Software's best title".

Bob Chappell writing for Personal Computer News also liked it: "The caverns are filled with defence systems, making the game possibly the toughest and most varied version of this classic to date." Home Computing Weekly covered Airstrike II in issue #054, concluding: "The graphics are nicely detailed and well complemented by colour. If you haven't tired of the idea, Airstrike 2 should satisfy your appetite for quite a while."

References

External links

1983 video games
Atari 8-bit family games
Atari 8-bit family-only games
Horizontally scrolling shooters
Video games developed in the United Kingdom
English Software games